"I Don't Wanna Lose Your Love" is a song written by Joey Carbone and recorded by the American country music artist Crystal Gayle.  It was released in February 1984 as the second single from the album Cage the Songbird. The song reached number 2 on the Billboard Hot Country Singles & Tracks chart.

The song was originally sung by John O'Banion in 1982, titled "I Don't Want to Lose Your Love". He won the grand prize for the song at the 1982 Tokyo Music Festival.

Charts

Weekly charts

Year-end charts

References

External links
 

1984 singles
John O'Banion songs
Crystal Gayle songs
Song recordings produced by Jimmy Bowen
Warner Records singles
Songs written by Joey Carbone
1982 songs